Michael Ferris may refer to:

Michael Ferris (politician) (1931–2000), Irish Labour Party politician
Michael Ferris, American screenwriter